Charles Dissels (born 21 December 1984 in Amsterdam) is a Dutch footballer who plays as a winger. He formerly played for FC Volendam, Sparta Rotterdam, SC Cambuur and Almere City.

Club career
Dissels, the son of a Surinamese father and a Moluccan mother, was schooled in the youth departments of FC Amstelland, FC Abcoude and FC Volendam and made his debut for Volendam's main squad on 6 December 2003 in their 7–0 away defeat to PSV. He became the club's top scorer for the 2006–07 season, with 12 goals. He moved to Sparta Rotterdam for the 2007–08 season.
After the relegation of Sparta at the end of the 2009–10 season he returned to FC Volendam on a free transfer. After a season at SC Cambuur, Dissels joined Almere City in 2012. He later had a spell with amateur side Magreb '90, but left the club after it was left in turmoil due to their chairman being jailed in Turkey.

References

External links
 Voetbal International profile 

1984 births
Living people
Footballers from Amsterdam
Dutch footballers
Dutch sportspeople of Surinamese descent
Dutch people of Indonesian descent
Association football forwards
FC Volendam players
Sparta Rotterdam players
SC Cambuur players
Almere City FC players
Eredivisie players
Eerste Divisie players